Eucalyptus pruiniramis, commonly known as Jingymia gum or midlands gum is a species of mallee or tree that is endemic to a small area of Western Australia. It usually has rough bark on the lower half of the trunk, smooth bark above, dull green, lance-shaped adult leaves, flower buds in groups of between seven and eleven, white flowers and cylindrical to cup-shaped fruit.

Description
It has smooth greyish or blackish bark, usually with rough fibrous bark on the lower half of the trunk. Flowering occurs in summer and the flowers are white. New taxa and combinations in Eucalyptus (Myrtaceae) in Western Australia |journal=Telopea |date=1992 |volume=4 |issue=4 |page=563}}</ref>

TaxonomyEucalyptus pruiniramis was first formally described in 1992 by Lawrie Johnson and Ken Hill in the journal Telopea. The specific epithet (pruiniramis) is from Latin, meaning "rime" or "hoar-frost" and "-of a branch", referring to the white, waxy covering on the branches.

Distribution and habitat
Jingymia mallee grows in low mallee woodland on rocky hillsides between Mogumber and Arrino. It is only known from nine populations with a total of about 58 plants and only one population is in a reserve.

Conservation status
This mallee is listed as "endangered" under the Australian Government Environment Protection and Biodiversity Conservation Act 1999'' and as "Threatened Flora (Declared Rare Flora — Extant)" by the Department of Environment and Conservation (Western Australia). The main threats to the species are road and fence maintenance, gravel extraction, grazing and weed infestation.

See also
List of Eucalyptus species

References

Eucalypts of Western Australia
Trees of Australia
pruiniramis
Myrtales of Australia
Plants described in 1992
Taxa named by Lawrence Alexander Sidney Johnson
Taxa named by Ken Hill (botanist)